The 1953 Round Australia Trial, officially the Redex Trial was the inaugural running of the Round Australia Trial. The rally took place between 30 August and 13 September 1953. The event covered 10,460 kilometres around Australia. It was won by Ken Tubman and John Marshall, driving a Peugeot 203.

Results

References

Rally competitions in Australia
Round Australia Trial